Unchained Memories: Readings from the Slave Narratives is a 2003 American documentary film about the stories of former slaves interviewed during the 1930s as part of the Federal Writers' Project and preserved in the WPA Slave Narrative Collection. This HBO film interpretation directed by Ed Bell and Thomas Lennon is a compilation of slave narratives, narrated by actors, emulating the original conversation with the interviewer.  The slave narratives may be the most accurate in terms of the everyday activities of the enslaved, serving as personal memoirs of more than two thousand former slaves.  The documentary depicts the emotions of the slaves and what they endured.  The "Master" had the opportunity to sell, trade, or kill the enslaved, for retribution should one slave not obey.

History
The largest collection of slave narratives emerged from the Federal Writers' Project. Created by the Federal Government under the WPA to reduce unemployment during the 1930s, one component of the Federal Writers' Project involved interviews with thousands of former slaves in 17 states. The oral history interview project yielded an extraordinary set of 2,300 autobiographical documents known as the Slave Narrative Collection. What emerged from these documents were pictures of living standards, the daily chores, and long days, along with stories of the good and bad "Master." The brutality, torture, and abuse under slavery are themes in the interviews.

After the Civil War ended in 1865, more than four million slaves were set free. The main objectives were to inform the public and describe the history and life of the former slaves. More than 2,000 slave narratives along with 500 photos are available online at the Library of Congress as part of the "Born in Slavery" project.

Slaves and readers
James Green, Texas, Volume 16 – read by Samuel L. Jackson 0:08 – last time I ever ... see her
Narrated by: Whoopi Goldberg 1:30
Sarah Gudger, North Carolina, Volume 11 – read by LaTanya Richardson 4:21 – never know nothin' but work
Charley Williams, Oklahoma, Volume 13 – read by Ruben Santiago-Hudson 6:40 – bells and horns
Frances Black, Texas, Volume 16 – 8:18 – he bought you for to play with me
Martin Jackson, Texas, Volume 16 - read by Robert Guillaume 8:35 – my new master was only two
Henry Coleman, South Carolina, Volume 14 – read by Roscoe Lee Browne 9:39 peafowl fly-brushes
Jennie Proctor, Texas, Volume 16 – read by Oprah Winfrey 10:40 – beaten over a biscuit
Jenny Proctor, Texas, Volume 16 – 12:54 – Webster's old blue-back speller
Elizabeth Sparks, Virginia, Volume 17 – read by Angela Bassett 14:30 – knit all day, some had gizzards instead of hearts
Rosa Starke, South Carolina, Volume 14 – 15:28 – there was more classes amongst the slaves
Cato Carter, Texas, Volume 16 – read by Roger Guenveur Smith 16:00 – I was one of their blood, I was one of the most dudish
Mary Reynolds, Texas, Volume 16 – read by Angela Bassett 17:26 – we got the same daddy you has
Rev. Ishrael Massie, Virginia – 18:26 – make slave get up and do as they say
Fannie Berry, Virginia – read by CCH Pounder 19:02 – some slaves would be so beat up when they resisted
Mary Estes Peters, Arkansas, Volume 2 – read by Jasmine Guy 19:48 – that's the way I came to be here
Sarah Ashley, Texas, Volume 16 – read by LaTanya Richardson 21:36 – I always get my 300 pounds
Charles Grandy, Virginia — read by Ruben Santiago-Hudson 23:00 – til the blood come
Marshall Butler, Georgia, Volume 4 – read by Samuel L. Jackson
William Colbert, Alabama, Volume 1 – read by Courtney B. Vance
Katie Darling, Texas, Volume 16 – read by Jasmine Guy
Vinnie Brunson, Texas, Volume 3 – read by Vanessa L. Williams
Fannie Berry, read by CCH Pounder
Jack & Rosa Maddox, Texas, Volume 7 – read by Ossie Davis and Ruby Dee
Mary Reynolds, Texas, Volume 16 – read by Angela Bassett
Louisa Adams, North Carolina, Volume 11 – read by LaTanya Richardson
Octavia George, Oklahoma, Volume 13 – 
Sarah Ashley, Texas, Volume 17 – 
Charles Grandy, Virginia – read by Ruben Santiago-Hudson
Shang Harris, Georgia, Volume 4 – read by Don Cheadle
Beverly Jones, Virginia – 
Wash Wilson, Texas, Volume 16 – 
Mary Reynolds, Texas, Volume 16 – 
Marshall Butler, Georgia, Volume 4 – read by Samuel L. Jackson
Fannie Berry, Virginia – 
Lucindy Lawrence Jurdon, Alabama, Volume 1 – 
Mary Reynolds, Texas, Volume 16 – 
Tempie Herndon Durham, North Carolina, Volume 11 – read by Vanessa L. Williams
Rose Williams, Texas, Volume 16 – 
Sarah Frances Shaw Graves, Missouri, Volume 10 – 
Laura Clark, Alabama, Volume 1 – read by Oprah Winfrey
W.L. Bost, North Carolina. Volume 11 – read by Ossie Davis
Robert Falls, Tennessee, Volume 15 – read by Don Cheadle
Cato Carter. Texas, Volume 16 – read by Roger Guenveur Smith
Thomas Cole, Texas, Volume 16 – read by Ruben Santiago-Hudson
Arnold Gragston, Florida, Volume 3 – read by Courtney B. Vance
Mary Reynolds, Texas, Volume 16 – 
Arnold Gragston, Florida, Volume 3 – read by Courtney B. Vance
Katie Row, Oklahoma, Volume 13 – 
Pvt. Spottswood Rice, Co A, 67th US Colored Infantry – read by Roscoe Lee Browne
William Moore, Texas, Volume 16 – read by Samuel L. Jackson
Katie Rowe, Oklahoma, Volume 13 – 
Wash Ingram, Texas, Volume 16 – read by Michael Boatman
Robert Falls, Tennessee, Volume 15 – read by Don Cheadle

See also
List of films featuring slavery

References

Further reading
A Sketch of the Laws Relating to Slavery in the Several States of the United States of America. Stroud, George M. (George McDowell), 1795-187
An Introduction to the WPA Slave Narratives. Yetman, Norman R.
When I Was a Slave: Memoirs from the Slave Narrative Collection. Yetman, Norman R.
Prison & Slavery - A Surprising Comparison. Gleissner, John D.

External links

"Unchained Memories: Readings from the Slave Narratives", in Time, 2002.

American documentary films
2003 films
2003 documentary films
Films scored by Terence Blanchard
Documentary films about slavery in the United States
2000s English-language films
2000s American films